Nagisa Station is the name of two train stations in Japan:

 Nagisa Station (Nagano) 
 Nagisa Station (Gifu)